Holy Avenger is a Brazilian comic book series by writer Marcelo Cassaro and artist Erica Awano.

A post-teenage Brazilian comic, it is set in the medieval fantasy world of Arton, part of the RPG campaign setting Tormenta.

Overview

The series lasted for 42 issues (40 regular ones and a 2-issue "post-end" story). Spinoffs include special issues that portray each of the main characters individually, an audio CD with voice actors playing the characters, an RPG book based on events in the series, an artbook with original sketches, and a new edition.

The English name Holy Avenger was given to the series because it can both refer to a D&D magical item and one of the main characters, the Paladin. A Portuguese name would have been gender-specific to indicate either the sword or the fighter, and thus wouldn't work the same way. In this case, the title becomes "Vingador Sagrado" (male gender) or "Vingadora Sagrada" (female gender).

History
Originally, Holy Avenger was an adventure for a D&D game published in the RPG magazine Dragão Brasil, issues #44 to #46, in 1998. In 1999, author Marcelo Cassaro made up his own RPG setting, called "Tormenta" (Storm, referencing an extraplanar storm that afflicted the campaign setting's world). He included the Holy Avenger characters in this new RPG setting. In 1999 he teamed up with Erica Awano to start an ongoing monthly comic series.

Initially, sales were unsatisfactory, but after about 10 issues the magazines took off.

The series was sent back to the newsstands through the short-lived Holy Avenger VR, which lasted only seven editions, and through Holy Avenger Reloaded, which had more pages and extra material.

Plot
The plot revolves around a 19-year-old girl, Lisandra, a druid who was raised by animals on the island of Galrasia. She starts having dreams about the Paladin, a hero who mysteriously disappeared a few years ago. This Paladin had in his armour the Rubies of Virtue, twenty magical gems forged by each one of the twenty most powerful gods of the world of Arton. The gems were scattered all over the world after the Paladin's disappearance, and, according to Lisandra's dreams, it is up to her to find them and return them to the Paladin, in order to revive him.

At first, with her "cousin" (a cave wolf), she discovers that one of the rubies was in the possession of a man who was cursed into a dragon form. Unable to fight the dragon on her own, she begins a quest to find the great thief Galtran, and so she travels to the city of Valkaria. This is the first time she left her island, and she knows no other human being. So, in the city, her "cousin" draws the attention of the city guard. She explains that it means no harm and she is only looking for Galtran. The guards passing by say that everyone is looking for him. When she says that she wants to hire him, they tell her that she must come with them. The wolf fatally attacks one of the guards to protect her. For wanting to hire a thief and being responsible for the death of a city guard, she is arrested. On the same night, Sandro Galtran (son of the great thief Leon Galtran) comes to rescue Lisandra from the palace's dungeon. After escaping, they go for the Ruby.

Characters 
The main characters of Holy Avenger are:

Lisandra: A 19-year-old half-dryad girl, raised by animals on the island of Galrasia. She is on a quest to reunite the 20 Rubies of Virtue to resurrect the Paladin.

Sandro: The son of Leon Galtran, the greatest thief of Arton. He frees Lisandra from a prison and helps her to find the Rubies. Sandro wishes to be a great thief, like his father, but he is clumsy and untalented.

Niele: A busty elven mage, that dresses only with leather strips, she is famous for having saved the city of Malpetrim from a water dragon. She meets Sandro as he tries to steal her Ruby of Virtue. She ends up helping him with his hunt for the Rubies of Virtue.

Tork: Tork is a trog, a species of reptilian humanoid. He is very short for the standards of his race, and was abandoned by his tribe when he was a baby. He makes a living as a mercenary. He is the one who taught Lisandra to speak, use clothes, and walk on two legs. Because of this, he calls her his daughter. He ends up helping her find the Rubies of Virtue. He usually rushes headlong into battle, and has a foul mouth.

The Paladin: The Paladin was once the Paladin of Jallar, a lesser goddess, but she killed him out of jealousy. He was resurrected and joined a group of adventurers. He later had his body infused with the 20 Rubies of Virtue by one of his ex-companions, Vladislav, granting him extraordinary powers and making him a legendary hero.

References

External links
 Former Official Site, as it was on 2007-03-26.
 The twenty gods of Arton - an example of Awano's work

Brazilian comics titles
Fantasy comics
Comics about magic